Fort Douglas may refer to:

 Fort Douglas (Canada), a Hudson's Bay Company fort near Winnipeg, Manitoba
 Fort Douglas, Utah, a former U.S. Army fort in Salt Lake City, Utah
 Fort Douglas (UTA station), a transit station at the site of the former fort